Cruz Grande  is a city and seat of the municipality of  Florencio Villarreal, in the state of Guerrero, south-western Mexico.

References

Populated places in Guerrero